The Domaal Rajputs are a Muslim Rajput tribe found principally in the Poonch and Rajouri districts in the Jammu region of Jammu and Kashmir, India and in Mirpur, Kotli, Nakyal and Chikar areas of Azad Kashmir.

History
According to their traditions, as to the origin of the Domaal tribe. One makes them out to be a branch of the Chib tribe of Bhimber, and according to this claims, the Domaal descend from two brothers Raja Dharam Chand and Raja Puran Chand. Raja Dharam Chand on a visit to Delhi was martyred by a Muslim king because the Chib Rajput King refused to convert to islam. But after he martyred, Muslims spread rumors that Raja Dharam Chand ji had converted to Islam. Then Rajputs chose his younger brother Puran Chand as the new chief of the tribe. Due to therumors,He later converted to Islam, and given the name Dom Khan. The Domaal are the descendants of Dom Khan, the suffix aal among Pahari Rajput clans signifies descent.  According to some sources, they account for 35% of the population in Rajauri District of Jammu and Kashmir.

The community occupies the southwestern slopes of the Pir Panjal range. Their villages are found along the slopes of hills overlooking a number of tributaries falling into the Poonch River and Chenab River.

Notable people
 Sardar Sikandar Hayat Khan, former-president and Prime Minister of Azad Jammu and Kashmir
 Retired Lef Sardar Ameer Mohammad Khan
 Sardar Fateh Mohd Khan Karelvi
 Shabir Ahmed Khan

References

Social groups of Jammu and Kashmir
Social groups of India
Indian Muslims